Morten Gustav Ræder (22 January 1939 – 5 November 2012) was a Norwegian surgeon.

He earned a dr.med. degree in 1975 and was a specialist in gastric surgery. He was a professor at the University of Oslo, a senior consultant at Ullevål Hospital and a fellow of the Norwegian Academy of Science and Letters.

References

1939 births
2012 deaths
Academic staff of the University of Oslo
Norwegian surgeons
Oslo University Hospital people
Members of the Norwegian Academy of Science and Letters